Interstate 794 (I-794; also known as East–West Freeway, Lake Parkway, and Lake Freeway) is a  auxiliary Interstate Highway in Milwaukee County in the US state of Wisconsin. It is one of two auxiliary Interstates in the Milwaukee metropolitan area, serves the lakefront and the Port of Milwaukee, and connects downtown with the southeastern suburbs of St. Francis, Cudahy, and South Milwaukee.

Route description
I-794 begins at the Marquette Interchange in downtown Milwaukee, where I-94 and I-43 meet. It continues eastward through downtown and turns southward near Lake Michigan at Lincoln Memorial Drive. The route crosses the Milwaukee River and the Port of Milwaukee as well as the Henry Maier Festival Park via the Hoan Bridge. The entire route is elevated on a viaduct. The Interstate designation ends at exit 3 at Carferry Drive, which provides access to the Lake Express ferry to Muskegon, Michigan; the highway continues south as State Trunk Highway 794 (WIS 794), also known as the Lake Parkway, to the intersection of Pennsylvania and Edgerton avenues on Cudahy's west side, running parallel and adjacent to the east side of Milwaukee Mitchell International Airport. Traffic volumes on I-794 range from 40,400 vehicles per day on the Hoan Bridge to 100,000 on the east–west Freeway.

History

The original plans for the Lake Freeway called for it to begin north of downtown Milwaukee at a connection to the proposed Park East Freeway, then to travel south from the downtown Milwaukee area to Milwaukee Mitchell International Airport. However, the Hoan Bridge was the only segment of the freeway to be built before strong opposition to the freeway resulted in its cancelation. This led to the Hoan Bridge being called the "Bridge to Nowhere" as it sat unused, with both of its ends unconnected to any other road, for three years. The unfinished bridge was long held as being used as the site of the car chase scene in the movie The Blues Brothers. In a 2016 article for the Shepherd Express, author Michael J. Prigge, pointing out that the bridge had been opened for two years when the film was shot, indicated another incomplete segment of I-794 had been used for the scene. An east–west freeway was later constructed between the Marquette Interchange and the Hoan Bridge, creating what is now known as I-794.

As part of his campaign for a more livable city in Milwaukee, Mayor John Norquist proposed to tear down the I-794 portion of the east–west freeway in 1995 in favor of a surface boulevard. His opposition to the freeway was rooted in the freeway cutting off the Historic Third Ward from the rest of downtown Milwaukee and hindering development in the area.  His effort failed when suburban opposition to the removal cited increased traffic volume on the road as well as the new Lake Parkway nearing completion. After opening, the Lake Parkway increased traffic volumes on I-794 to 111,000 vehicles per day by 2004.

The Marquette Interchange construction project undertaken between 2004 and 2008 rebuilt the east–west viaduct section of I-794 between the interchange and the Milwaukee River.

In February 2010, Milwaukee County Supervisor Patricia Jursik and South Milwaukee Mayor Tom Zepecki proposed a plan to expand I-794/Lake Parkway to Racine County. The expansion would follow an existing railroad corridor and was intended to relieve traffic along I-94.

Exit list

See also

References

External links

 East–West Freeway at Wisconsin Highways
 Lake Freeway at Wisconsin Highways
 Hoan Bridge: 2000 from Wisconsin Highways

94-7
94-7
Interstate 94
Freeways in the Milwaukee area
Transportation in Milwaukee County, Wisconsin